Tell Ishchali (also Iščāli or Šaǧālī) an archaeological site in Diyala Province (Iraq). It is thought to be ancient Nerebtum or Kiti and was part of the city-state of Eshnunna. It was occupied during the Old Babylonian period.

Ancient name
At first, the site of Ishchali was thought to be Khafajah. Upon discovery there of a date formula that read "year that king Ishme-Bali built the great wall of Nerebtum", that designation became popular. Currently, scholarly opinion is split between Nerebtum and Kiti as the result of many tablets from the temple of Inanna of Kiti being analyzed. The name of Sadlas has also been proposed.

A number of bricks of Ipiq-Adad II were found in the Kitium temple inscribed with:

History of archaeological research
Items from illegal excavations at Ishchali began appearing on the open market in the 1920s, including many clay tablets. To pre-empt this activity, the Iraq expedition of the Oriental Institute of Chicago conducted two seasons of excavations there between 1934 and 1936. The expedition was led by Henri Frankfort and the work at Ishchali was handled by Thorkild Jacobsen and Harold Hill, all of the Oriental Institute.

Tell Ishchali and its environment

There are also small mounds to the north and south of it.

History of occupation
Surface finds indicate that Ishchali may have been occupied as far back as the Akkadian period, but all excavated epigraphic evidence dates to the Old Babylonian period. While some tablets mention early local rulers, for most of the known history of Ishchali kings from Eshnunna held sway there, including Ipiq-Adad and Ibal-pi-El. During the time of Sabium, king of Babylon, Ibal-pi-El I of
Ešnunna, Sîn-iddinam of Larsa and Sîn-kašid of Uruk the king of Nerebtum was Iku(n)-pi-Si.

The most notable feature of Ishchali is the main temple. It was that of Inanna-Kitium, or Inanna of Kiti. It is one of the largest temples ever found in the ancient Near East at 100 meters by 65 meters. Rebuilt several times, always following the original plan, the monumental building consisted of one large upper temple and two smaller areas which are thought to be shrines. The many tablets found there give an excellent picture of temple life. A number of cylinder seals dating from the Early Dynastic to the Larsa period were also found there, assumed to be relic donations to the temple. There
was also a smaller temple to the local city-god version of the god Sin.

Material culture
Of the 280 tablets excavated, 138 went to the Oriental Institute with the remaining 142 assigned to the Iraq Museum. The tablets illegally excavated from Ishchali are in many locations including the Lowie Museum of Anthropology at Berkeley, the Musée d'Art et d'Histoire in Geneva, Iraq Museum, Oriental Institute, and the Free Library of Philadelphia.

Artifacts from Ishchali

See also

Cities of the ancient Near East
Short chronology timeline

References

Further reading
 
 
 
 
 Miglus, P.A. (1998–2001). Nērebtum. In Reallexikon der Assyriologie und Vorderasiatischen  Archäologie IX (pp. 211–214). Berlin: Walter de Gruyter
 Yuhong, W. (1994). Te treaty between Shadlash (Sumu-numhim) and Neribtum (Hammi-dushur). Journal of Ancient Civilizations , 9, 124–136

External links
Ishchali tablets at CDLI
Terracotta plaque from Ishchali at the Oriental Institute
Reconstruction of Kitium Temple at ARTEHISTORIA

Archaeological sites in Iraq
Diyala Governorate
Former populated places in Iraq
Tells (archaeology)